Clayton railway station was on the Great Northern Railway  lines to Bradford, Keighley and Halifax via Queensbury, collectively known as the Queensbury Lines.

History 

The station  served the village of Clayton in West Yorkshire, England. The station had an island platform and a reasonable goods yard. The station opened for passengers in 1878 and closed in 1955, but the goods yard and tunnel remained open as a through route to Thornton Station up until the early 1961 when it closed completely and the tracks were torn up. The cutting and station site have been infilled and houses erected on the site. The Bradford portal of Clayton Tunnel has also been infilled.

Clayton tunnel 
Clayton tunnel lay immediately west of Clayton railway station. During the construction of the  tunnel in 1874, two workers were killed when their lift fell down No1 shaft. The man operating the lift was found to be drunk at the time of the accident. The tunnel's eastern approach cutting has been infilled and built on since the railway's closure and, in 2012, cannabis was found being cultivated inside after a routine inspection by Carillion on behalf of British Railways Board (Residuary).

References

External links
 Clayton station on navigable 1947 O. S. map

Disused railway stations in Bradford
Former Great Northern Railway stations
Railway stations in Great Britain opened in 1878
Railway stations in Great Britain closed in 1955